Anacamptis papilionacea (formerly Orchis papilionacea) is a species of flowering plant in the orchid family Orchidaceae. It is commonly known as the pink butterfly orchid.

Distribution and habitat 
The species is found in Southern Europe and Northern Africa (Spain, Turkey, Serbia, Cyprus, Lebanon, Aegean Islands, ...), and favors dry and stony ground.

References

External links 

papilionacea
Plants described in 1759
Orchids of Lebanon